Nandanam metro station is a Metro railway station on the Blue Line of the Chennai Metro. The station is among the underground stations along corridor I of the Chennai Metro, Wimco Nagar–Chennai International Airport stretch. The station serves the neighbourhoods of Nandanam and T. Nagar.

History

Construction

The station

The station has a length of 230 to 250 meters.

Station layout

Facilities
List of available ATM at Nandanam metro station are

Connections

Bus
Metropolitan Transport Corporation (Chennai) bus routes number 1B, 12C, 18A, 18D, 18E, 18K, 18R, 23C, 23V, 41D, 45B, 45E, 51J, 51P, 52, 52B, 52K, 52P, 54, 54D, 54M, 60, 60A, 60D, 60H, 88Ccut, 88K, 88R, 118A, 188, 221, 221H, A45B, A51, B18, D51, E18, M45E, M51R, N45B, serves the station from nearby Nandanam Military Quarters bus stand.

Entry/Exit

See also

 Chennai
 Anna Salai
 List of Chennai metro stations
 Chennai Metro
 Railway stations in Chennai
 Chennai Mass Rapid Transit System
 Chennai Monorail
 Chennai Suburban Railway
 Chennai International Airport
 Transport in Chennai
 Urban rail transit in India
 List of metro systems

References

External links

 
 UrbanRail.Net – descriptions of all metro systems in the world, each with a schematic map showing all stations.

Chennai Metro stations
Railway stations in Chennai